Popularly known as Sarmad Sindhi (7 July 1961 – 27 December 1996) (Sindhi: سرمد سنڌي) (Urdu:سرمد سندھی) for his work on Sindhi Folk Music was a Sindhi folk singer, songwriter of Sindhi language.
Considered one of the great singers of  Golden era of Sindhi literature and Sindhi music

He sang all kinds of folk songs including his very popular song ‘Tuhiji yaad Ji wari aa weer’,  and another popular song still listened in all over Sindh‘Piyar Manjharan Pengho Loday Loli Diyan’, which became an anthem of his generation.

Singing career
Sarmad Sindhi's lyrics focused on the problems faced by the people living in the province such as ‘"Sindh uchi aa, Sindhi uchi aa"’ (Sindh is great).

Maroo loli and Tuhinji Yaad ji wari aa weer were his first songs which were aired from Radio Pakistan, Hyderabad. Some of his songs are in Saraiki language as well.

Death and legacy
Sarmad Sindhi was returning from Badin to Karachi, when his vehicle collided with a truck trolley in which he along with his friends were badly injured. While he was being taken to a hospital, he died on the way on 27 December 1996.

Sindhi Adabi Sangat (Sindhi Writers' Association) held an event on his death anniversary in 2017 at a local town Piryaloi, Khairpur District to pay tributes to him where many literary figures including poet Sajjad Mirani, Roshan Shaikh and Saeed Sindhi addressed this event. On this occasion, speakers mentioned his social work in the local community besides being a singer where he was also known as a social worker who supported a number of needy families and children's education.

References

External links 
Sarmad Sindhi songs on YouTube
Sarmad Sindhi music and songs on Apple Music website

1961 births
1996 deaths
Pakistani folk singers
People from Mirpur Khas District
Sindhi-language singers
20th-century Pakistani male singers